SPARK Schools is an independent school network in South Africa. SPARK Schools was founded by Stacey Brewer and Ryan Harrison in 2012. Their schools use a blended learning model with adaptive software and individualised learning to accelerate learning and increase student achievement. SPARK Schools uses a hybrid funding model, having attracted funding from both non-profit foundations focused on high impact philanthropy and from for-profit impact investors.

There are 19 primary schools and 1 high school in the SPARK Schools Network.

History 

SPARK Schools was started to provide internationally competitive high quality academic achievement to South African communities. The original motivation and concept for SPARK Schools was developed at the Gordon Institute of Business Science (GIBS) where Stacey Brewer, Bailey Thomson and Ryan Harrison are alumni. South Africa is consistently ranked among the worst performing education systems in the world. SPARK Schools was built on the belief that quality and affordability are not mutually exclusive when it comes to excellent education. SPARK Schools emerged as a pioneer of blended learning in Africa and implemented the first blended primary school model in Africa.

SPARK Ferndale was launched as the first SPARK school in 2013. SPARK Schools became an ISASA full member and accredited network in 2013.

SPARK Core Values 
SPARK is an acronym for the Schools core values: Service, Persistence, Achievement, Responsibility and Kindness. The name of the network also took inspiration from the quotation often misattributed to  William B. Yeats quote; "Education is not the filling of a pail, but the lighting of a fire". While this quotation is often attributed to the Irish poet W.B. Yeats there is no evidence that he ever wrote or said those words.

Founding Team 
The founding team consisted of Stacey Brewer (Executive Director & Founding Principal), Ryan Harrison (Non-executive director), Bailey Thomson (Director of Leadership and Development) and Caitlin Burkholder-Travis (Director of Student Achievement).

Education Model

Foundation Phase 
SPARK Schools uses a lab rotation blended learning model that combines classroom instruction with adaptive software intended to accelerate learning and increase student achievement. SPARK Schools uses a lab rotation blended learning model, that was pioneered by Rocketship Education.

The blended education model allows for a high level of individualised learning as student receive instruction in the classroom as well as through adaptive education technology.

Intermediate Phase 

SPARK Schools uses a flex model for students in Grade 4-7 (Intermediate Phase). At this level, scholars are in ability groups based on their own individual performance in the subjects. This allows for an even more individualised form of education.

High school 

SPARK Schools launched their first high school in January 2019. SPARK Randburg High School is located in Ferndale, Randburg and focuses on academic development that prepares scholars for Matric and beyond.

Academic Performance 

Ambitious claims are made for SPARK Schools as a high performing school network, with internationally relevant rigour and benchmark assessment.

Media coverage 

SPARK Schools has been featured in various media outlets including, the Economist, the Mail & Guardian, Forbes, the Sunday Times, the Sowetan, The Sunday Independent, and Finweek SPARK Schools has also been covered on various Radio and Television shows including, Talk Radio 702, Classic FM, iGIBS, and CNBC Africa.

SPARK Schools has also been featured in various academic publications such as Focus (Helen Suzman Foundation) and Acumen as well as various international blogs, such as Getting Smart, LeadSA, Daily Maverick The New Game and EdSurge.

SPARK Schools has been profiled in various forums and reports by ISASA, the Centre for Development and Enterprise and the Clayton Christensen Institute.

The earliest record of SPARK Schools can be found in the Sowetan Newspaper in an article titled: Low Cost Private Education 
Initiative.

List of SPARK Schools 
As of January 2022 there are currently 20 schools in the SPARK Schools Network.

SPARK Primary Schools

Gauteng, South Africa
 SPARK Bramley
 SPARK Carlswald
 SPARK Centurion
 SPARK Cresta
 SPARK Ferndale
 SPARK Kempton Park
 SPARK Midrand
 SPARK Randpark Ridge
 SPARK Riversands
 SPARK Rivonia
 SPARK Rosslyn Hub
 SPARK Rynfield
 SPARK Silver Lakes
 SPARK Soweto
 SPARK Theresa Park
 SPARK Turffontein
 SPARK Weltevreden Park
 SPARK Witpoortjie
Western Cape, South Africa
 SPARK Lynedoch
SPARK High Schools
 SPARK Randburg High School

Funding 
SPARK Schools has received funding both from foundations focused on high impact philanthropy and from for-profit impact investors. Funders/investors including CREADEV, Finnfund, Omidyar Network, Pearson Education (Pearson Affordable Learning Fund), the Good Schools Fund, Imaginable Futures and various high-net-worth individuals.

Notable Achievements 

SPARK Schools was invited to the 2013 Skoll World Forum to present alongside Salman Khan (Khan Academy), Sandy Speicher (IDEO) and Debra Dunn (Stanford University) on the panel, Blended Learning: The Proof and the Promise.

SPARK Schools was recognised by the Accenture Innovation Index Awards as "an innovation that changes the way the world works" and placed as a finalist in the 2013 innovation index.

Awards 
 2014 Accenture Innovation Index Awards Finalist
 2015 South African Employer of Choice (<1000 employees)
 2015 FNB Innovation Awards Finalist
 2015 Elle Boss Awards
 2015 Standard Bank Top Women Awards
 2016 EOY Innovator of the Year Award
 2016 Acer for Education - Innovative School
 2016 All Africa Business Leader Award (AABLA) - Innovator of the Year
 2017 EY Entrepreneurial Winning Women
 2022 Financial Times - Africa's fastest-growing Education company

Relationship with eAdvance Group 
eAdvance Group provides centralised business functions such as procurement, IT services, media and financial management to the SPARK Schools network. It also provides specialised education services such as education model innovation, curriculum development and educator development; such as training and leadership development.

See also 
 Rocketship Education (USA)
 Bridge International Academies (Kenya)
 Independent Schools Association of Southern Africa (ISASA)
 KIPP (USA)
 Uncommon Schools (USA)

References

External links
 Omega Schools (Ghana)
 Official Website

Private schools in Gauteng
2012 establishments in South Africa
Educational institutions established in 2012